Daina is a Latvian and Lithuanian given name and may refer to: 
Daina Augaitis (born 1953), Canadian curator
Daina Gudzinevičiūtė (born 1965), Lithuanian Olympic shooting champion 
Daina Reid, Australian actor and director 
Daina Šveica (born 1939), Latvian rower
Daina Taimiņa (born 1954), Latvian mathematician 
Daina Warren, Canadian artist and curator

References

Latvian feminine given names
Lithuanian feminine given names